Leo Conlon (3 January 1901 – 29 January 1973) was  a former Australian rules footballer who played with Footscray in the Victorian Football League (VFL).

Notes

External links 
		

1901 births
1973 deaths
Australian rules footballers from Victoria (Australia)
Western Bulldogs players
South Ballarat Football Club players